The Iranian futsal champions are the annual winners of Iranian Futsal Super League, Iran's premier annual Futsal league competition. The title has been contested since 1996, in varying forms of competition. While Mes Sungun has won a record 4 championship titles.

Winners

Province championship (1996–2002)

Premier league (1998–2003)

Super league (2003– )

Performances

Most successful clubs

Titles by city

Total titles won by province
The following table lists the Iranian futsal champions by Province.

Title wins by decade

See also
 Futsal in Iran
 Iranian Futsal league system
 Iranian Futsal Super League
 List of Iranian club futsal top goal scorers
 List of Iranian futsal league winning managers

References

External links 
  I.R. Iran Football Federation
  Super League page on Futsal Planet

Champions
Champions